The Ibanez ZR (Zero Resistance) Tremolo is a double locking tremolo system developed by Ibanez.  The ball-bearing and global tuner features of the ZR tremolos are manufactured under license to American Inventor and recording artist, Geoffrey Lee McCabe—see U.S. Patent Nos. 6,175,066 5,965,831, 6,891,094, 5,986,191, 6,563,034 and 7,470,841.

The system was derived from Ibanez Edge and Floyd Rose, but it functions closer to that of a Kahler Tremolo System. The ZR tremolo offers a number of improvements from the Original Floyd Rose; it contains a heavy sustain block, a pop-in arm and most importantly, a ball bearing-based pivot point and a removable stop-bar. This is also known as the Zero Point System.

In a traditional Floyd Rose (and vintage tremolo), the pivot is a knife edge against the pivot post; when sharpened, the pivot provides zero rotational friction. However, like any knife edge it can become dulled over time and the result is the tremolo cannot return to the zero position. In the ZR tremolo, the pivot is a ball-bearing based joint, which provides greater stability over time.

The Zero Point System acts like the Hipshot Tremsetter, in that it provides additional string tension that is needed to return the string to the zero position. Normally both the spring tension and opposing string tension is equal, when a tremolo bar is used for a very long duration (such as excessive dive bombs), the spring tension may be compressed to the point that no tension is provided for the string. Thus, the ZPS, which equips with two additional springs, provide the needed tension and the fact that it is a stop-bar allows extreme tuning stability at the cost of having very limited scope for up-bends. Another important innovation of the ZR tremolo is that, unlike other locking tremolos, even with a string break, the other strings can still stay in tune to an acceptable level.  The ball-bearing and global tuner features of the ZR tremolos are manufactured under license to American Inventor and recording artist, Geoffrey Lee McCabe—see U.S. Patent Nos. 6,175,066 5,965,831, 6,891,094, 5,986,191, 6,563,034 and 7,470,841.

First installed on Ibanez S and replacing the Floyd Rose licensed Edge Lo-TRS, its ZPS system is also being used on the Ibanez Edge Zero.

In 2008 models, Ibanez introduced derivatives of ZR Tremolo:
ZR-II, the successor to ZR tremolo; This system is the same as the original ZR tremolo, with the only differences being the use of a different alloy in the spring assembly, and a new design of arm holder. These changes were made to address the problems that the original ZR removed too much wood for its back route, and that the arm holders on original ZR tremolo systems are prone to breaking. first introduced on S Prestige series 2008
sychroniZR, a single locking tremolo with ZPS-FX springs (only react when tremolo is pulled), first introduced on the SV Prestige series
 Edge Zero, a knife-edge based tremolo with ZPS3 springs, first introduced on the RG Prestige 2008 line and Ibanez E-Gen

See also
Ibanez Edge
Ibanez S

Guitar parts and accessories
Guitar bridges